The 1980 Trevira Cup was a men's tennis tournament played on indoor carpet courts in Frankfurt, West Germany that was part of the WCT category of the 1980 Volvo Grand Prix. It was the inaugural edition of the tournament and was held from 17 March until 23 March 1980. Unseeded Stan Smith won the singles title.

Finals

Singles
 Stan Smith defeated  Johan Kriek 2–6, 7–6, 6–2
 It was Smith' only singles title of the year and the 48th and last of his career in the Open Era.

Doubles
 Stan Smith /  Vijay Amritraj defeated  Andrew Pattison /  Butch Walts 6–7, 6–2, 6–2
 It was Smith' 2nd doubles title of the year and the 47th of his career in the Open Era. It was Amritraj' 2nd doubles title of the year and the 10th of his career.

References

External links
 ITF tournament edition details

Trevira Cup
Trevira Cup